The Madagascar was a ship of the Rennie line that was lost in 1858 after she hit a reef near the mouth of the Birha River, south of East London, in South Africa, around midnight on 3 December. Attempts to keep the ship afloat failed and she was run aground on the 4th and broke up. There were no deaths.

References

Further reading
 Ingpen, B. &  Ingrid Staude-Griesel (Ed.) (2000) Horizons: The Story of Rennies, 1849-1999. Johannesburg: Rennies Management Services. 

Maritime incidents in December 1858
1855 ships
Maritime incidents in South Africa